Metrosideros sclerocarpa, commonly known as the mountain rose, is a flowering plant in the family Myrtaceae.

Description
It is a small tree, growing to 10 m in height. The leathery ovate to elliptic leaves are 30–65 mm long and 17–32 mm wide. The bright red brush-like flowers have filaments 15–20 mm long. The fruits are 6–7 mm long. The flowering season is from December to February.

Distribution and habitat
The plant is endemic to Australia's subtropical Lord Howe Island in the Tasman Sea. It occurs mainly near watercourses, below an elevation of about 300 m, in the southern mountains of the island.

See also
Metrosideros nervulosa – a similar and closely related plant also endemic to Lord Howe, also known as "mountain rose", differentiated by altitudinal range

References

sclerocarpa
Endemic flora of Lord Howe Island
Myrtales of Australia
Plants described in 1990
Taxa named by John Dawson (botanist)